Two is a 1974 American drama film directed by Charles Trieschmann and starring Sara Venable. It was entered into the 24th Berlin International Film Festival.

Cast
 Sara Venable - Ellen
 Douglas Travis - Steven
 Clifford Villeneuve - Irate Driver
 Ray Houle - Doctor Dudley
 Florence Hadley - Hardware Customer
 William Green - Husband
 Thelma Green - Wife
 Sylvia Harman - Bank Teller
 Elwyn Miller - Guard
 Jack Dykeman - Man in Bank
 Stanley McIntyre - Chief of Police
 Fred Gilbert - Policeman
 Winston Merrill - Postal Clerk

References

External links

1974 films
1974 drama films
American drama films
1970s English-language films
1970s American films